Kharfakol (also known as Khal’fakyul’, Kharfeh Kal, and Kharfeh Kol) is a village in Ahmadsargurab Rural District, Ahmadsargurab District, Shaft County, Gilan Province, Iran. At the 2006 census, its population was 640, in 155 families.

References 

Populated places in Shaft County